Mi Na (born August 5, 1986) is a Paralympic athlete from China. She competes in throwing events for F37 classification cerebral palsy athletes. From April 2014 until September 2016 she held the women's F37 World Record in the shot put. She holds the world record in the F37 discus throw. She won 9 medals (6 Gold) at the Paralympic Games and 12 medals (10 Gold) at the IPC Athletics World Championships.

Mi began competing in para-athletics in 2005, and made her international debut in 2008. She competed at the 2008 Summer Paralympics in Beijing, China, where she won gold medals in the women's shot put F37/F38 and discus throw F37/F38 events, setting new F37 world records both events. At the 2012 Summer Paralympics in London, Mi repeated this double, winning the F37 shot put and F37 discus gold medals with world record throws. She placed 4th in the F37/F38 javelin event at the 2012 Paralympics. At the 2016 Rio Games she won the discus throw and placed second in the javelin and shot put.

References

External links

 

1986 births
Paralympic athletes of China
Paralympic gold medalists for China
Paralympic silver medalists for China
Living people
Chinese female shot putters
Chinese female discus throwers
World record holders in Paralympic athletics
Cerebral Palsy category Paralympic competitors
Medalists at the 2008 Summer Paralympics
Medalists at the 2012 Summer Paralympics
Medalists at the 2016 Summer Paralympics
Medalists at the 2020 Summer Paralympics
Athletes (track and field) at the 2008 Summer Paralympics
Athletes (track and field) at the 2012 Summer Paralympics
Athletes (track and field) at the 2016 Summer Paralympics
Athletes (track and field) at the 2020 Summer Paralympics
World Para Athletics Championships winners
Paralympic medalists in athletics (track and field)
21st-century Chinese women